The Tennessee Titans Cheerleaders are the cheerleading squad of the Tennessee Titans of the NFL. The squad performs a variety of dance moves during home games at Nissan Stadium, and performs with Titans mascot T-Rac, as well as their junior squad. The squad was established in 1975 as the Derrick Dolls, and changed to the current name when the Titans (then known as the Oilers) moved to Tennessee. The group currently has 25 cheerleaders. The squad also makes USO trips, with the members making trips to Kuwait and Diego Garcia for their All-Star Super Bowl Tour. The squad holds auditions at Baptist Sports Park. Other than performances on the field, the squad also has made appearances on "The Oprah Winfrey Show" and "The Dr. Oz Show". Annually, the squad makes a swimsuit calendar, and one that's available to download onto tablets and smartphones. The squad also makes appearances off the field.

The Titans have used male cheerleaders in their history multiple times, from 1999-2003, and again from 2019.  The men were originally called "yell leaders," with a similar role to collegiate cheerleading, and the high-risk stunting will return in 2019.

Notable members
Kiara Young (2013–present), Miss Tennessee USA 2015
Haley Brooke Sowers (2015–present), Miss Mississippi USA 2016

References

External links

 Titans Cheerleaders Official Site
 Titans Cheerleaders Alumni Facebook Page

Tennessee Titans
National Football League cheerleading squads
1997 establishments in Tennessee
Performing groups established in 1997
History of women in Tennessee